Cletis Gordon (born April 23, 1983) is a former American football cornerback in the National Football League for the San Diego Chargers, Dallas Cowboys and Carolina Panthers. He played college football at Jackson State University.

Early years 
Gordon attended Amite High School. He received All-district honors as a senior. He also practiced basketball.

He accepted a football scholarship from Jackson State University. He was nicknamed Flash, while playing as defensive back, kickoff returner, punt returner and wide receiver. 

As a sophomore, he set a school record with 95-yard kickoff return for a touchdown in the 2003 Circle City Classic against Florida A&M University. As a junior, he became a starter at cornerback. He was considered as the Southwestern Athletic Conference top kick returner. 

He finished his college career with 691 receiving yards, 9 receiving touchdowns, 1,508 kickoff return yards with 2 touchdowns, 492 punt return yards with 2 touchdowns, 98 tackles (4.5 for loss) 11 interceptions (3 returned for touchdowns) and 16 passes defensed.

In 2011, he was named to the Jackson State University All-Century Team.

Professional career

San Diego Chargers 
Gordon was signed as an undrafted free agent by the San Diego Chargers after the 2006 NFL Draft on May 10. As a rookie, he appeared in 2 games and was declared inactive in 14 contests. He had one tackle.

In 2007, he played in 14 games, posting 8 special teams tackles, 8 defensive tackles and one pass defensed. He made his postseason debut in the Wild Card Playoff Game against the Tennessee Titans and made one special teams tackle.

In 2008, he played in 14 games (one start), registering 4 special teams tackles, 8 defensive tackles and one pass defensed. He saw action as a cornerback in the AFC Divisional Playoff Game against the Pittsburgh Steelers, after starter Quentin Jammer suffered an injured ankle and hamstring. He made 5 tackles in the contest. He was released on August 24, 2009

Houston Texans 
On August 28, 2009, he was signed as a free agent by the Houston Texans. He was cut on September 1.

Detroit Lions 
On September 2, 2009, he was claimed off waivers by the Detroit Lions. He was released on September 6.

Dallas Cowboys 
On October 6, 2009, the Dallas Cowboys signed him as a free agent. He played on special teams against the Kansas City Chiefs, before being released on October 13. He was re-signed on November 23. He appeared in one game, while being declared inactive in the last 6 games and 2 playoff contests. In 2010, he was limited with a neck injury in preseason and was released on September 4.

Florida Tuskers 
Gordon was signed by the Florida Tuskers of the United Football League on October 19, 2010. Where he recorded 134 tackles, 17 forced fumbles and a record high 2 carries for 146 yards.

Carolina Panthers 
On July 30, 2011, the Carolina Panthers signed Gordon to a contract. On August 25, he was placed on the injured reserve list with a shoulder injury. He wasn't re-signed after the season.

Personal life 
Gordon is the cousin of former NFL fullback Alan Ricard and former NFL quarterback Lester Ricard. Gordon is an assistant football coach for Trinity Classical Academy in Santa Clarita, California.

References

External links 
Carolina Panthers bio

1983 births
Living people
People from Amite City, Louisiana
Players of American football from Louisiana
American football cornerbacks
American football return specialists
Jackson State Tigers football players
San Diego Chargers players
Houston Texans players
Detroit Lions players
Dallas Cowboys players
Florida Tuskers players
Carolina Panthers players